Raúl González (born October 27, 1971) is a
Venezuelan TV host and actor. Born in Caracas, Venezuela, he always aspired to be a television personality. He began his career acting in children’s Popet theatre in his native Maracaibo. In his early twenties, he hosted a kids' TV show in Venezuela, Supercrópolis. In 1994, he moved to Miami, where he  eventually became one of the hosts on the popular morning show Despierta América,  along with Fernando Arau, Ana Maria Canseco, and news anchor Neida Sandoval. In February 2014, after 13 years of co-hosting Univision’s morning show Despierta America, he left the show  to join the Telemundo network where he co-hosted with Angelica Vale the new variety show ¡Qué Noche!.

González returned to Despierta América as a co-host in September 2019.

TV Shows Host
 Gran Oportunidad (Telemundo, 2017)
 ¡Qué Noche! (Telemundo, 2014–16)
 Miss Universe (Telemundo, 2014)
 Miss Teen USA (Xbox Live, 2014–15)
 Billboard Latin Music Awards (Telemundo, 2014)
 Un Nuevo Día (Telemundo, 2014-17)
 Despierta America (Univision, 2001-2014; 2019–present)
 Supercrópolis (RCTV, 1992-1994)
 Chamocrópolis (Televen)

References

Living people
People from Caracas
Venezuelan male actors
1971 births